The Tipton Green Branch and Toll End Branch (or Toll End Communication Canal) were narrow canals comprising part of the Birmingham Canal Navigations near Tipton (formerly in Staffordshire), West Midlands, England. These canals no longer exist.

History
The Tipton Green Branch was completed around 1805 with 3 locks and a length of quarter of a mile.

The Toll End Branch was authorised by Act of Parliament in 1783 (along with the Birmingham and Fazeley Canal, Broadwaters Canal, and several other branches) to provide access to a proposed new coal mine. Work was started from the Broadwaters Canal (now part of the Walsall Canal) but halted in 1784 for eight years, being completed as a closed branch with two locks in 1801. In 1806 it was decided to extend this branch to the Tipton Green Branch with further locks, and in January 1809 the Toll End Communication Canal was completed  making the length 1 3/8 miles.

In 1829  Thomas Telford's BCN New Main Line (Island Line)cut across the Tipton Green Canal, forming Watery Lane Junction, and creating a de facto Tipton Green Locks Branch of three locks and a Toll End Locks Branch of seven locks. From the later 20th Century Caggy's Boatyard occupied the basin at Watery Lane Junction.

The Horseley Ironworks operated their first foundry from a site between the two branches where many iron bridges, including the Engine Arm Aqueduct (1825), two roving bridges at Smethwick Junction (1828) and Galton Bridge, were cast.

Having suffered from a century or more of declining traffic due to the advent of trains and then motor vehicles, the Tipton Green Branch became disused in 1960, and the Toll End Branch in 1966, after some of the locks along the canal became immovable. The locks and canals were infilled in 1968. The Tipton Green locks were lined with houses which were built around the mid 19th century, but these were demolished around the time of the canal's closure.

The brick base of one lock on the Tipton Green canal, however, remains in existence, forming part of a public footpath that followed the course of the canal and was opened in about 1975.

One part of the Toll End canal has since been occupied by the car park of a factory in Toll End Road. There is also an "open" drain along the route of the canal at the back of Tipton Cemetery, but apart from this the canal has been almost obliterated. Almost all of the bridges are still in existence, apart from the bridge on Bridge Road which carried the road under the Toll End Canal. This bridge was replaced with a flat road several years after the canal was filled in.

Route

See also

Canals of the United Kingdom
History of the British canal system

References

Ordnance Survey Six Inch Series (1:10,560), Map SO99SE, 1955
Historical Map of the Birmingham Canals, Richard Dean, M. & M. Baldwin, 1989, 

Birmingham Canal Navigations
Tipton
Canals in the West Midlands (county)
Transport in Staffordshire
Canals opened in 1805
Canals opened in 1809
1805 establishments in England